Naomi Seidman is Chancellor Jackman Professor in the Arts at the University of Toronto, and was previously Koret Professor of Jewish Culture and the Director of the Richard S. Dinner Center for Jewish Studies at the Graduate Theological Union in Berkeley.  In 2016, she received a Guggenheim Fellowship.

She comes from an Orthodox, Yiddish-speaking rabbinic family, and was a daughter of Hassidic Jewish writer Dr. Hillel Seidman.

Her writings focus on the relationship between Judaism, literature, gender studies, translation studies, and sexuality.

Selected works 

 .
 .
 .

References 

Academic staff of the University of Toronto
Living people
Year of birth missing (living people)